Randesund is a former municipality that was located in the old Vest-Agder county in Norway. The  municipality existed from 1893 until its dissolution in 1965.  The administrative centre was the village of Randesund where Randesund Church is located.  The municipality was located in the southeastern part of the present-day municipality of Kristiansand, east of the Topdalsfjorden and south of the old municipality of Tveit. Since 1965, the area of Randesund has been the district of Randesund within the city of Kristiansand.

History
The municipality was established on 31 December 1893 when it was split off from the large municipality of Oddernes to form a separate municipality of its own. Initially, Randesund had a population of 1,133. During the 1960s, there were many municipal mergers across Norway due to the work of the Schei Committee. On 1 January 1965, the municipality of Randesund (population: 1,672) was merged with the neighboring municipalities of Tveit (population: 2,802) and Oddernes (population: 18,668) and with the town of Kristiansand (population: 27,100) to form a new, much larger municipality of Kristiansand.

Name
The municipality (originally the parish) is named after the island, Randøen (now known as Randøya).  The first part of the name is rand which means "boundary" or "edge" and the last part of the name is sund which means "strait".  The name was previously spelled Randøsund.

Government
All municipalities in Norway, including Randesund, are responsible for primary education (through 10th grade), outpatient health services, senior citizen services, unemployment and other social services, zoning, economic development, and municipal roads.  The municipality was governed by a municipal council of elected representatives, which in turn elected a mayor.

Municipal council
The municipal council  of Randesund was made up of representatives that were elected to four year terms.  The party breakdown of the final municipal council was as follows:

See also
List of former municipalities of Norway

References

Kristiansand
Former municipalities of Norway
1893 establishments in Norway
1965 disestablishments in Norway